Nightrider is the sixth studio album by Charlie Daniels and the third as the Charlie Daniels Band, released on November 25, 1975.

Track listing 
All songs composed by the bandleader, Charlie Daniels, except where indicated:

Side one 
 "Texas" - 3:04
 "Willie Jones" - 3:14
 "Franklin Limestone" (Tom Crain) - 5:40
 "Evil" - 2:53
 "Everything Is Kinda All Right" - 5:11

Side two 
 "Funky Junky" - 5:06
 "Birmingham Blues" - 4:43
 "Damn Good Cowboy" - 4:35
 "Tomorrow's Gonna Be Another Day" - 3:31

There has been some confusion with the credits for the song "Birmingham Blues" that Charlie Daniels wrote for this 1975 album. In 1977, Jeff Lynne also wrote a song called "Birmingham Blues" for his band, Electric Light Orchestra's album, Out of the Blue, and now Allmusic shows the 1975 Charlie Daniels song as being co-written by Lynne (but not the other way around), which is nonsensical.

Personnel 
The Charlie Daniels Band:
 Charlie Daniels – banjo, fiddle, guitar, mandolin, vocals
 Taz DiGregorio – keyboards, vocals
 Tom Crain - guitar, vocals
 Charlie Hayward – bass guitar
 Don Murray –  drums
 Fred Edwards – drums

Additional musicians:
 Toy Caldwell – steel guitar on "Damn Good Cowboy"
 Jai Johanny Johanson – Congas on "Everything Is Kinda All Right"

Production personnel:
 Richard Schoff – assistant engineer
 Paul Hornsby – producer

References 

Charlie Daniels albums
1975 albums
Albums produced by Paul Hornsby